In mathematics, an Igusa group or Igusa subgroup is a subgroup of the Siegel modular group defined by some congruence conditions.

Definition

The symplectic group Sp2g(Z) consists of the matrices 

such that ABt and CDt are symmetric, and ADt − CBt = I (the identity matrix). 

The Igusa group Γg(n,2n) = Γn,2n consists of the matrices 

in Sp2g(Z) such that B and C are congruent to 0 mod n, A and D are congruent to the identity matrix I mod n, and the diagonals of ABt and CDt are congruent to 0 mod 2n.
We have Γg(2n)⊆ Γg(n,2n) ⊆ Γg(n) where Γg(n) is the subgroup of matrices congruent to the identity modulo n.

References

 

Automorphic forms